The Arab Socialist Action Party – Lebanon or ASAP–L ( | Hizb al-'Amal al-Ishtiraki al-'Arabi - Lubnan), is the Lebanese branch of the of the Arab Socialist Action Party. The party is the Lebanese equivalent of the Popular Front for the Liberation of Palestine (PFLP).

Origins
The party was founded by George Habash in 1969 and was closely linked to the PFLP, which Habash also led.
The party held its first congress in 1972, during which it distanced itself from other communists by advocating violence as the best means by which to end class conflict. Although a secular group, most of the party's membership came from the Shia Muslim community.

The ASAP–L in the Lebanese Civil War
The ASAP–L was a member of the Lebanese National Resistance Front during the Lebanese Civil War. In 1976, the party confiscated the estates of the Shia za'im Kazem al-Khalil at a village near Tyre. The purpose of
the confiscation was to turn the estates into a collective; but the SAAP soon lost control of the estates in 1982 with the Israeli invasion.

The party's leader Hussein Hamdan took part in the founding of the Lebanese National Resistance Front, along with George Hawi of the Lebanese Communist Party and Mohsen Ibrahim of the Communist Action Organization.

See also
Lebanese Civil War
Lebanese National Movement
Lebanese National Resistance Front
1982 Lebanon War
Mountain War (Lebanon)

References

1969 establishments in Lebanon
Arab nationalism in Lebanon
Arab nationalist militant groups
Arab Nationalist Movement breakaway groups
Arab nationalist political parties
Factions in the Lebanese Civil War
Lebanese National Resistance Front
Marxist parties in Lebanon
Nationalist parties in Lebanon
Pan-Arabist political parties
Political parties established in 1969
Political parties with year of disestablishment missing
Secularism in Lebanon
Socialist parties in Lebanon